Saliha Dilaşub Sultan ("the devout one" and "queen bee's heart", died 3 January 1690), also known as Aşub Sultan or Aşube Sultan, was a consort of Ottoman Sultan Ibrahim and valide sultan to their son Suleiman II.

Life
She was of Serbian descent and her original name was Katarina.

She became the first concubine of Ibrahim after his rise at the throne and on 15 April 1642, gave birth to her only certain son, Şehzade Suleiman (the future Suleiman II) and she became the second Haseki after Turhan Sultan. During Ibrahim's reign her stipend consisted of 1,300 aspers a day. He also gifted the incomes of Bolu Sanjak to her. She was described as a simple-hearted woman of lively and cheerful character. 

After the deposition and death of Sultan Ibrahim in 1648, his eldest son, Mehmed IV, only three months older her own son Suleiman, ascended the throne, after which Saliha Dilaşub settled in the Old Palace. This brought her thirty-nine years of imprisonment in the Old Palace.

In 1652 the conflict between Mehmed's mother, Turhan Sultan, her mother-in-law, Kösem Sultan could have change her fortune in that she could become the Valide Sultan herself. Kösem was planning to kill her daughter-in-law and dethrone her grandson Sultan Mehmed with the help of some high officers in the yeniçeri corps, and to place Şehzade Suleiman, on the throne, because Kösem thought that him and his mother were more controllable. However, Meleki Hatun warned Turhan who managed to strangle her mother-in-law with the help of the eunuchs in the Harem in 1651. Saliha Dilaşub herself was spared from execution since she was not suspected in plotting against Turhan and her son Mehmed IV.  

In 1672–1673, she created an endowment at Istanbul. 

In 1687 Mehmed IV was deposed and the throne was overtaken by Suleiman II, the son of Saliha Dilaşub and she became the next valide sultan. 

In July 1688, she followed her son to Edirne, reuniting with him after 39 years of separation in which she was only allowed to see him twice a year, on the occasion of festive celebrations. Her son honored her with a splendid settlement procession and the awarding of a large number of precious jewels, including a pair of pearl and diamond earrings.

Death

She died in the Edirne Palace on 3 January 1690, having been ill and bedridden for a year. She was buried in the mausoleum of Suleiman the Magnificent in Süleymaniye Mosque, Istanbul.

Issue
Together with Ibrahim, Saliha Dilaşub had only one certain son:
 Suleiman II (Topkapı Palace,  Istanbul, 15 April 1642 - Edirne Palace, Edirne, 22 June 1691, buried in Süleymaniye Mosque, Istanbul). Sultan of the Ottoman Empire.

It is not known for sure if she had other children, but, if Saliha Dilaşub was indeed Ibrahim's first concubine, she was probably at least the mother of his eldest daughter as well: 
Safiye Sultan (Istanbul, 1640 - ?). She married Baki Bey, son of the Grand Vizier Hezarpare Ahmed Paşah by his first wife.

In popular culture
In the 2010 Turkish historical film Mahpeyker: Kösem Sultan, Saliha Dilaşub Sultan is portrayed by Turkish actress Gökcan Gökmen.
In the 2015 Turkish historical non-fiction TV series Muhteşem Yüzyıl: Kösem, Saliha Dilaşub Sultan is portrayed by Turkish actress Ece Güzel.

See also
Ottoman family tree
Women in the Ottoman Empire
List of the mothers of the Ottoman Sultans
List of consorts of the Ottoman Sultans

Notes

References

Sources

Year of birth unknown
1689 deaths
17th-century consorts of Ottoman sultans
Valide sultan